The Opus sacerdotale Amici Israel or the Clerical Association of Friends of Israel, was a short-lived international organization of  Roman Catholic priests founded in Rome in February 1926. Its purpose was to pray for the conversion of the Jews and to promote a favorable attitude towards them within the Roman Catholic Church. By the end of the year, its membership included 18 cardinals, 200 bishops and about 2,000 priests. When the association was dissolved by the Holy Office on 28 March 1928, its membership included 19 cardinals, more than 300 bishops and archbishops and about 3,000 priests.

Its ideas were outlined in leaflets written in Latin and circulated among the clergy. 

Its first request to the Church was that the word "perfidis", which described the Jews during the Good Friday Prayer for the Jews, be removed, since some believed the prayer could be interpreted as anti-Semitic. Pope Pius XI asked the Congregation of Rites to consider the proposed reform. Alfredo Ildefonso Schuster, a member of the Amici Israel and a liturgist who was then a Benedictine abbot and soon to become Cardinal Archbishop of Milan, was appointed to monitor this issue. The Congregation of Rites authorized the proposed change but the Holy Office withheld its consent. On 7 March 1928 its head, Cardinal Rafael Merry del Val, himself a member of the Friends, objected:

Pius reluctantly accepted this view the next day. He advised that the announcement that the Amici was being dissolved be handled with great care.

The decree from the Holy Office that announced the suppression of the association upheld the traditional Catholic belief that Christianity had superseded Judaism (supersessionism), asserted the need to pray for the conversion of the Jews, and firmly condemned racist antisemitism:

This was the Holy See's first authoritative statement condemning anti-semitism.

See also
 Anti-Judaism
 Good Friday prayer for the Jews
 Nostra aetate
 Pope Pius XI and Judaism

References

Catholicism and Judaism
Conversion of Jews to Christianity
Organizations disestablished in 1928
Christian organizations established in 1926
Catholic organizations established in the 20th century